The Balts' Award is an annual award given to recognise excellence and achievements in the areas of Latvian-Lithuanian culture, history and language.

The award was inaugurated in 2018.

List of recipients
 2018: Laimute Balode, professor and linguist

See also

 List of history awards

References

History awards
Latvian culture
Lithuanian culture
Latvia–Lithuania relations